Rory G. Hanniffy (born 1982) is an Irish hurler who played as a centre-back for the Offaly senior team.

Born in Birr, County Offaly, Hanniffy first played competitive hurling during his schooling at Birr Community School. He arrived on the inter-county scene at the age of seventeen when he first linked up with the Offaly minor team before later joining the under-21 side. He made his senior debut during the 2001 National Hurling League. Hanniffy went on to enjoy a lengthy career, winning two National League (Division 2) medals.

As a member of the Leinster inter-provincial team on a number of occasions, Hanniffy won six Railway Cup medals. At club level he is a two-time All-Ireland medallist with Birr. In addition to this he also won three Leinster medals and six championship medals.

Throughout his career Hanniffy made 45 championship appearances. He announced his retirement from inter-county hurling on 12 November 2014.

Hanniffy's father, Declan, and his brothers, Darren and Rory, also played with Offaly.

Honours

Team

Birr
All-Ireland Senior Club Hurling Championship (2): 2002, 2003
Leinster Senior Club Hurling Championship (3): 2001, 2002, 2007
Offaly Senior Club Hurling Championship (8): 2000, 2001, 2002, 2003, 2005, 2006, 2007, 2008 (c)

Offaly
National Hurling League (Division 2) (1): 2005, 2009
Leinster Under-21 Hurling Championship (1): 2000
Leinster Minor Hurling Championship (1): 2000

Leinster
Railway Cup (5): 2003, 2006, 2008, 2009, 2012

Individual

Honours
Offaly Hurler of the Year (1): 2006

References

1982 births
Living people
Birr hurlers
Offaly inter-county hurlers
Leinster inter-provincial hurlers